Milburn Peter Akers (May 4, 1900 – May 27, 1970), often known as Pete Akers, was a Chicago journalist, chairman of the board of trustees of McKendree College, and the ninth president of Shimer College.

Akers was born in Chicago and graduated from McKendree College, of which his great-grandfather had been the first president.  In his early life, he worked as a staff reporter for newspapers including the Peoria Transcript and Illinois State Register. He served as the publicity man for Governor Henry Horner from 1937 to Horner's death in 1940.

Akers joined the Chicago Sun, later the Chicago Sun-Times, shortly after its founding in 1941.  He became executive editor of the Sun-Times in 1950, rising from the position of managing editor; his position became simply "editor" after the departure of Marshall Field III from that position.  After retiring from the paper in 1965, he became an important figure in Illinois higher education due in part to his political ties.  From 1965 to 1967 he served as president of the Federation of Independent Illinois Colleges and Universities.

In 1968, Akers was appointed president of Shimer College following the resignation of Francis Joseph Mullin in the aftermath of the Grotesque Internecine Struggle.

On May 27, 1970, Akers was killed in a head-on collision with a truck south of Hopedale, Illinois.  He had been traveling to Springfield, Illinois to lobby for a law providing greater aid to small liberal arts colleges such as Shimer.

Notes

See also
History of Shimer College

1970 deaths
1900 births
Presidents of Shimer College
Journalists from Illinois
Chicago Sun-Times people
Writers from Chicago
Road incident deaths in Illinois
20th-century American non-fiction writers
20th-century American journalists
American male journalists
20th-century American male writers
20th-century American academics